The following is a list of programs that were formerly broadcast on the Latin American cable channel Boomerang.

Programming

Animated series 

6teen
The 13 Ghosts of Scooby-Doo
A Pup Named Scooby-Doo
The Adventures of Bottle Top Bill and His Best Friend Corky
The Adventures of Hello Kitty & Friends
The Adventures of Rocky and Bullwinkle and Friends
ALF: The Animated Series
Angelina Ballerina
Angelo Rules
Animaniacs
Arabian Knights
Arthur
As Aventuras de Gui & Estopa
Ashita no Nadja
Atom Ant
Atomic Betty
Attack of the Killer Tomatoes
Augie Doggie and Doggie Daddy
Baby Looney Tunes
Barbie Dreamhouse Adventures
Barbie shorts
Be Cool, Scooby-Doo!
Beetle Bailey
Ben 10
The Berenstain Bears
Betty Toons
Bigfoot Presents: Meteor and the Mighty Monster Trucks
Birdman and the Galaxy Trio
Bratz
Breezly and Sneezly
CB Bears
Captain Caveman and the Teen Angels
Captain Planet and the Planeteers
Cardcaptors
The Care Bears
Casper's Scare School
Cattanooga Cats
Cave Kids
The Centurions
Cloudy with a Chance of Meatballs
Clue Club
Cool McCool
Corneil & Bernie
Curious George
Cyberchase
DC Super Hero Girls
DC Super Hero Girls (2019)
DC Super Hero Girls Super Shorts
Dastardly and Muttley in Their Flying Machines
Dinosaur Train
Dive Olly Dive!
Dorothy and the Wizard of Oz
Dragon
DreamWorks Dragons
Duck Dodgers
Dudley Do-Right
Dumb Bunnies
Dynomutt, Dog Wonder
Eckhart
El Chavo Animado
Eliot Kid
Extreme Ghostbusters
Fantastic Four
Felix the Cat
Firehouse Tales
Flash Gordon
The Flintstone Kids
The Flintstones
The Forgotten Toys
Fortune Dogs
Four Eyes!
Fractured Fairy Tales
Frankenstein Jr. and the Impossibles
Franklin
Franny's Feet
The Funky Phantom
Garfield and Friends
The Garfield Show
Gatchaman
George of the Jungle
Gerald McBoing-Boing
Ghostbusters
Girlstuff/Boystuff
Godzilla
Goober and the Ghost Chasers
Gran
The Great Grape Ape Show
Grizzy and the Lemmings
Hamtaro
The Happos Family
He-Man and the Masters of the Universe
Hello Kitty's Paradise
Help!... It's the Hair Bear Bunch!
The Herculoids
The Hillbilly Bears
Hokey Wolf
Hong Kong Phooey
Hoot Kloot
Horseland
The Huckleberry Hound Show
Inspector Gadget
Jabberjaw
Jackie Chan Adventures
Jacob Two-Two
Jeannie
The Jetsons
Jonny Quest
Josie and the Pussycats
Josie and the Pussycats in Outer Space
Jumanji
The Jungle Bunch
Kaleido Star
Kangaroo Creek Gang
The Karate Kid
Kipper
Krypto the Superdog
Laff-A-Lympics
The Land Before Time
The Life and Times of Juniper Lee
Lippy the Lion & Hardy Har Har
The Little Lulu Show
Looney Tunes
The Looney Tunes Show
Loopy De Loop
The Magic School Bus
Magilla Gorilla
Maisy
Marcus Level
Masha and the Bear
Masha's Spooky Stories
Masha's Tales
Master Raindrop
Max & Ruby
Maya & Miguel
Mew Mew Power
Miffy and Friends
The Mighty Hercules
Mighty Mike
Mike, Lu & Og
Mirmo!
Miss Spider's Sunny Patch Friends
Misterjaw
Mixels
Moby Dick and Mighty Mightor
Mona the Vampire
Monica's Gang
Monster High
Monster High: The Adventures of the Ghoul Squad
Mr. Bean: The Animated Series
Mr. Magoo
¡Mucha Lucha!
My Dad the Rock Star
My Knight and Me
Ned's Newt
The New Archie and Sabrina Hour
The New Scooby-Doo Movies
The New Woody Woodpecker Show
New Looney Tunes
Ninja Express
Oddbods
Oggy and the Cockroaches
PINY: Institute of New York
Pac-Man
Paw Paws
The Pebbles and Bamm-Bamm Show
Pecola
Peppa Pig
The Perils of Penelope Pitstop
Pet Alien
Peter Potamus
Pink Panther and Pals
Pink Panther and Sons
Pink Panther
Pinky and the Brain
The Pirates of Dark Water
Pixie and Dixie and Mr. Jinks
Pokémon (Season 20)
Popeye
Postcards from Buster
Pound Puppies
The Powerpuff Girls
The Powerpuff Girls (2016)
Powerpuff Girls Z
Precious Pupp
Preston Pig
Polo
Punkin' Puss and Mushmouse
Quick Draw McGraw
 The Road Runner Show'Richie RichRicochet Rabbit & Droop-a-LongRuby GloomRuff and ReddySagwa, the Chinese Siamese CatThe Scooby-Doo ShowScooby-Doo and Guess Who?Scooby-Doo! Mystery IncorporatedScooby-Doo, Where Are You?The Scooby-Doo and Scrappy-Doo ShowSealab 2020Secret SquirrelShazzanShe-Ra: Princess of PowerShirt TalesThe SkatebirdsThe SmurfsSnagglepussSnooper and BlabberThe SnorksSonic BoomSpace GhostSpeed BuggySpeed RacerSquiddly DiddlyStokedStrawberry ShortcakeSuper 4Super ChickenSuper FriendsThe Super GlobetrottersSWAT Kats: The Radical SquadronThe Sylvester & Tweety MysteriesTalking Tom and FriendsTaffyTaz-ManiaTeen Titans Go!Teenage Mutant Ninja TurtlesThundarr the BarbarianThunderCatsTom and JerryTom & Jerry KidsThe Tom and Jerry ShowTom and Jerry TalesTom SlickToopy and BinooTop CatTotal Drama ActionTotal Drama IslandTotally Spies!Touché Turtle and Dum DumTracey McBeanTractor TomTrunk TrainThe Twisted Tales of Felix the CatThe Twisted Whiskers ShowUncle GrandpaUnderdogUnikitty!Viva PiñataWacky RacesWacky Races (2017)Wally GatorWeeBoomWhat's New, Scooby-Doo?Winsome WitchWinx ClubWonder WheelsWoody WoodpeckerYakky DoodleYippee, Yappee and YahooeyYogi BearThe Yogi Bear ShowYogi's GangYogi's Space RaceYogi's Treasure HuntYooHoo & FriendsThe Zeta ProjectZuzubalandia Live-action series 31 MinutosThe Adrenaline Project Aliens Among UsAmerica's Best Dance CrewAtracción x4The Banana SplitsThe Basil Brush ShowBeakman's WorldBel's BoysThe Big Comfy CouchBlue Water HighBritannia HighThe Carrie DiariesChiquititasConnor UndercoverDance AcademyDarcy's Wild LifeDate My MomDinosapienDon't Blame the KoalasEl Chapulín ColoradoEl Chavo del OchoFlight 29 DownFlipperForeign ExchangeGilmore GirlsGirls in LoveH2O: Just Add WaterHarry and the HendersonsHeartlandHellcatsHow to Be IndieInstant StarKif-KifLa BandaThe Latest BuzzLazyTownLockie LeonardThe Lying GameMajority Rules!Mr. YoungMy Parents Are AliensThe Nightmare RoomNPS: No puede serOut ThereOverruled!Parental ControlPretty Little LiarsRadio Free RoscoeRebeldeRincón de LuzThe Saddle ClubScout's SafariThe Secret Life of the American TeenagerShoebox ZooThe Sleepover ClubSnobsSomos tú y yoSplitSurvive ThisThat's So Weird!What I Like About YouZixx Programming blocks 
From 2006 to 2008, Boomerang aired different blocks on the schedule for different audiences. The programming blocks included segments for young audiences, teenagers, and classic programming at night. The blocks were "color-coded" as the logo of the channel changed its color depending on which programming block was currently airing.

After June 2008 (January in the Mexican and Brazilian localised feeds), the channel decided to focus its programming on teenagers, dropping the preschool and classic programming of the channel. Since February 2009, the network only used the blue-green colored logo, as the other color-coded logos were eliminated.

 Boombox: A musical segment that aired since late 2007, which included music videos, live performances, and music documentaries for various artists, such as Avril Lavigne, Katy Perry, Lady Gaga, Paramore, Thirty Seconds to Mars, and others. It was removed in April 2014.
 Mini TV ("Tiny TV"): It consisted of preschool programming focused on children from 2 to 6 years old. It originally aired every morning. The logo turned yellow during this block. It was dropped in January 2008 in the Brazilian and Mexican localised feeds (June in the pan-regional feed).
 Luces, Cámara, Boomerang/Luz, Câmera, Boomerang ("Lights, Camera, Boomerang"): This programming block was the only one to already exist on the former Boomerang and wasn't dropped from the channel. It aired different movies, most of them focused on teenagers. The logo kept its original colors. The block was removed by April 2014, and Cine Boomerang was broadcast instead as of October 2014.
 Regular programming: Boomerang aired regular programming focused on children and family. It aired mostly during the day. The logo turned red or sometimes translucent white. By 2008, up until the second quarter of 2014, the network's regular programming was focused on teenagers, with dramas from international territories.
 Live Action: Boomerang aired teen-focused programming, with series, reality shows and music videos. It was aired in late afternoon and early night. The logo turned blue and green.
 Película Boomerang/Filme Boomerang ("Boomerang Movie"): Movie sessions during the day only on weekdays. The logo turned totally blue.
 Matinee del Domingo/Matinê de Domingo ("Sunday Matinee"): A movie during the morning of every Sunday. The logo turned red with orange.
 Boomerang Clásico/Boomerang Clássico ("Classic Boomerang"): Classic programming aired every night and early morning until dawn. The logo turned totally green. It was dropped in January 2008 in the Mexican and Brazilian  localised feeds (June in the pan-regional feed).
 Boomeraction: One of the first blocks to air on Boomerang, its programming focused on action-adventure shows including Thundarr the Barbarian, SWAT Kats: The Radical Squadron, The Pirates of Dark Water, Jonny Quest and Space Ghost''. It was also one of the only Boomerang blocks to air across international feeds, including the United States, United Kingdom, and Australia versions of the network. The block was removed by April 3, 2006 due to the first rebrand, as all programming from the block left the schedule.
 CineBoom
 Cine Boomerang
 Boomerang Extra

See also 

 List of programs broadcast by Cartoon Network (Latin America)
 List of programs broadcast by Cartoonito (Latin America)

References

External links 

Boomerang (TV network)
Boomerang (TV network)
Cartoon Network-related lists
Warner Bros. Discovery EMEA